The Project 58181 Centaur (Kentavr)/Project 58503 Centaur-LK class is a series of small armored assault craft being built for the Ukrainian Navy. The first two vessels were laid down at the Kuznya na Rybalskomu in December 2016. The 58181 project was developed by State Research and Design Shipbuilding Center on the basis of the s, and the 58503 project number was assigned to the altered design used after construction of the first eight units began (by the contractor that oversaw their construction, PJSC ZLK. Designed for carrying patrol service on rivers and coastal maritime areas, delivery and landing of marines.

Development and design 

The project 58181 was developed by State Research and Design Shipbuilding Center on the basis of the s in 2015. However, it was refined during construction. The first contract was signed in 2016. 
On September 4, 2018, the first launching ceremony for the first boat of the first series was held. The boat was already built on a revised project, which received new project number 58503 and the code «Centaur-LK». On September 20, the second boat of the series was launched. On November 19, 2018, newly built assault boats arrived to Odessa to continue testing. The top speed of 50 knots is achieved by a pair of New Zealand-made Hamilton Jet water jet propulsion engines and can stay at sea for a maximum of five days. The class is armed with two remote weapon stations with 12.7 mm high-caliber machine guns and a 40-mm rocket launcher. The boats also feature two 80-mm rocket-launch systems.

Failure of the first two units of «Centaur-LK» led to a criminal conviction, the halting of construction of future units (besides the third), and the Ukrainian Navy's decision not to include the first two craft in its active combat fleet. As of 6 February 2022, they had not yet joined its active combat fleet. Between then and April 2022, according to Taras Chmut's reporting, they were accepted into active service.

Deployment 
On 8 May 2022, Russian Defence Ministry claimed, that the lead vessel of the class, DSHK-1 Stanislav, was destroyed near the Russian-controlled Snake Island. In November 2022, the sinking was confirmed by Ukrainian Pravda and Dumskaya.

Vessels

Gallery

See also 
 
 Multipurpose Assault Craft
 List of active Ukrainian Navy ships

Notes

References

External links 
 Fast assault craft “Kentavr” at the State Research and Design Shipbuilding Center
 

Ships built at Kuznya na Rybalskomu
Patrol vessels of the Ukrainian Navy
Military boats
Landing craft